The Irish Girl Guides is a Girl Guides organisation in the Republic of Ireland.
Together with the Catholic Guides of Ireland, it forms the Council of Irish Guiding Associations.  Whereas the Catholic Guides are an all-Ireland body, the Irish Girl Guides are not organised in Northern Ireland, where Girlguiding Ulster, the branch of Girlguiding UK, operates instead.

History
As a soldier, the Founder of Scouting and Guiding, Robert Baden-Powell discovered that boys could be trained and used to help in emergencies. He held an experimental camp at Brownsea Island in Dorset in 1907 at which the boys were divided into patrols and trained to be self-reliant.

The first big rally for Scouts was held at Crystal Palace outside London in 1909. At this there were 10,000 boys as well as some girls who dressed in a uniform and called themselves "Girl Scouts".

In 1910 Girl Guides were officially formed with the founder's sister, Agnes Baden-Powell, in charge. A syllabus for girls was drawn up for their training similar to that for the Scouts.

Only a year after the Girl Guide Movement was founded the first official company in Ireland was formed, in 1911 in Harold's Cross. Guiding quickly spread to Cork and Wicklow. At this time there was no border between North and South so Guiding was run as one organisation for all Ireland.

In 1921 Ireland was partitioned into the Irish Free State and Northern Ireland, by the Government of Ireland Act (1920), and a separate organisation for the Free State was created from the whole, the Irish Free State Girl Guides.

Ireland became a separate member of the WAGGGS in 1932.

In 1938 the name of the organisation was changed to the Irish Girl Guides

In July 1993 at the 28th World Conference in Denmark, the Council of Irish Guiding Associations was ratified as a full member of WAGGGS. The Council of Irish Guiding Associations consists of The Irish Girl Guides and the Catholic Guides of Ireland on behalf of their members in the Republic of Ireland.

The World Conference was held in Dublin in July 1999. An International Guide Camp known as "Solas" was held in Charleville, Co. Cork in July 2002, International Camp known as "Campa Le Cheile" was held in Tattersalls, Co. Meath in July 2007, International Guide Camp: "Camp 101" was held in 2012, in Lough Key forest park, Boyle, with visitors from 14 different countries. The most recent International camp "IGGNITE2017" was held in Rockwell College, Co. Tipperary 30 July – 6 August 2017. The next International camp is due to take place in 2021.

The Honorary Ambassador for 2017 was Sinéad Burke.

Age groups
The Irish Girl Guides has four different age brackets:
 Ladybirds are girls aged 5–7
 Brownies are girls aged 7–10
 Guides are girls aged 10–14
 Senior Branch are girls aged 14–30 
 Leaders are age of 18 onwards

 The Ladybird Guides uniform is a red jumper, navy neckerchief, sash and woggle.
 The Brownie Guides uniform is a yellow jumper, navy neckerchief, sash and woggle.
 The Guides uniform is a blue hoodie with a blue or pink T-shirt, white neckerchief with pink and blue Celtic knots and navy woggle.
 The Senior Branch uniform is navy with green lining and green logo in a T-shirt and hoodie, and a pink neckerchief.
 Leaders wear a lilac or navy fleece, lilac T-shirt or blue blouse and a purple neckerchief with a navy woggle, or a blue and green neckerchief with a silver scarf ring. Leaders and Senior Branch members may also wear a badge tab.

Ladybirds
Ladybirds are aged 5–7 and make a two-part promise, which is reflected in their sign which uses only two fingers, unlike the Guide and Brownie sign which uses three.

Brownies

Brownies are aged from 7 to 10. Their Leader-in-charge is called a Brown Owl and her assistant a Tawny Owl

The girls are divided into sixes, each headed by a sixer, for the purpose of many activities.

Guides
Guides, aged 10 to 14 years, not only enjoy active weekly meetings, but also have the opportunity to camp in the outdoors.

There are heaps of opportunities to earn badges for your favourite pastime and activities range from camping and adventure sports to sleep overs and pyjama hikes.

There is a huge international dimension to being a Guide, and girls have many opportunities to go on trips abroad to various camps and events. They also have the opportunity to participate in home hospitality in foreign countries where they can really get to know the culture and way of life in that country. Many foreign groups visit us here in Ireland as well.

The Guiding programme gives the Guides an all round education and development.

Senior Branch
The Senior Branch of IGG covers the age grouping 14 to 30 years of age. Guiding has something important and valuable to offer these young women which can help them to be tomorrow’s leaders in Guiding and wherever else life takes them. Senior Branch offers them the opportunity to experience adventure, enjoy international events, develop self-confidence and grow in independence.

Older guides
When a Guide reaches 14 years of age she is eligible to attend Senior Branch events, follow the Senior Branch programme within her Guide Company (as a senior patrol or on her own) and she can be registered at National Office to be put on the mailing list for The Welly!! and Trefoil News. By the time she finishes Guides the natural progression will be to join a Senior Branch unit, become a Leader or both depending on the choices available to her locally.

The aim of being a Senior Branch member is to enable the individual to work towards her full potential as an adult, physically, mentally, socially and spiritually. Senior Branch members organise activities and events that are of interest to them and, with the help of a Leader, they are encouraged to be independent and self-sufficient and to enjoy themselves!

Senior Branch members can work towards the Bronze Star, Silver Moon and Golden Sun awards. Completing these also qualifies one for the corresponding Gaisce award.

See also

 Scouting Ireland

References

External links
Official website of the Irish Girl Guides

World Association of Girl Guides and Girl Scouts member organizations
Scouting and Guiding in Ireland
Youth organizations established in 1911
1911 establishments in Ireland